"Ken Carter" is the second single released by Australian alternative rock band, Ammonia, from their debut album Mint 400.  The single was released by Sony Music Australia's imprint label, Murmur in late February 1996.

The single reached No. 50 on the Australian Recording Industry Association (ARIA) Singles Chart.

The song was named after Ken Carter, a Canadian stuntman who attempted to jump over the Saint Lawrence River in the late 1970s. Johnstone describes the song as being about feeling trapped in a relationship.

According to Allmusic's reviewer, Nitsuh Abebe, '"Ken Carter" sounds like a more rocked-out version of the Posies.' The South Florida Sun-Sentinel describes the beginning of "Ken Carter" as being nothing but annoying whining, although the addition of a great riff in the chorus gives it the high intensity that it needs. Other reviewers describe the song as starting out with a very watery sounding intro followed by a loud distorted chorus.

Track listing

Charts

Release

Personnel 
 Allan Balmont – drums
 Simon Hensworth – bass
 Dave Johnstone – guitar, vocals

Credits 
 Ted Jensen – Mastering
 Kevin Shirley – Producer, Engineer
 Mark Thomas – Engineer
 John Webber – Photography
 Simon Alderson – Art Direction
 Matt Lovell – Engineer
 Ben Glatzer – Producer

References

 General
 Note: [online] version established at White Room Electronic Publishing Pty Ltd in 2007 and was expanded from the 2002 edition.

 Specific

1995 songs
1996 singles
Ammonia (band) songs
Murmur (record label) singles
Song recordings produced by Kevin Shirley